Aaron Royle (born 26 January 1990) is an Australian triathlete.

Youth career 
He is a former under-23 world champion.

2014 season 
Royle took third at the event in Auckland in the 2014 ITU World Triathlon Series.

He won a bronze in the mixed relay at the 2014 Commonwealth Games.

2015 season 
Royle took third at the event in Stockholm in the 2015 ITU World Triathlon Series.

2016 season 
Royle took third at the event in Leeds in the 2016 ITU World Triathlon Series.

He competed at the 2016 Olympics where he finished 9th.

2021 season 
Royle competed in the men's triathlon at the 2020 Summer Olympics held in Tokyo, Japan. Royle also competed in the 2021 Super League Triathlon Championship Series, where he finished 13th.

References

External links 
 
 
 
 

1990 births
Living people
Australian male triathletes
Triathletes at the 2016 Summer Olympics
Triathletes at the 2020 Summer Olympics
Olympic triathletes of Australia
Commonwealth Games medallists in triathlon
Commonwealth Games bronze medallists for Australia
Triathletes at the 2014 Commonwealth Games
20th-century Australian people
21st-century Australian people
Medallists at the 2014 Commonwealth Games